This is the discography of American rapper Trick Daddy.

Albums

Studio

EPs 
 U Already Know (2014)

Mixtapes 
 Dick and Dynamite (2012)

Singles

As lead artist

As featured performer

Music videos

Guest appearances

References

Discographies of American artists
Hip hop discographies